The  is a five-axle C-B wheel arrangement diesel-hydraulic locomotive type operated in Japan as a self-propelled snowplough unit since 1967 by the national railway company Japanese National Railways (JNR), and later by Hokkaido Railway Company (JR Hokkaido), East Japan Railway Company (JR East), and West Japan Railway Company (JR West).

Variants
A total of 85 locomotives were built between 1967 and 1981, divided into the following sub-classes.
 Class DE15-0
 Class DE15-1000
 Class DE15-1500
 Class DE15-2050
 Class DE15-2500
 Class DE15-2550

Design
The Class DE15 was developed from the Class DE10 locomotive design, with the addition of separate two-axle snowplough units at either end. The snowplough units could be attached and detached relatively easily, allowing the locomotives to be used for shunting and other duties outside the winter periods, unlike the snowplough units on the earlier Class DD15 locomotives, which were mounted directly onto the locomotives and required a crane to be attached and detached.

History

DE15-0
Six Class DE15-0 locomotives were built between 1967 and 1969 by Kisha and Nippon Sharyo. The locomotives were based on the Class DE10-0 design and were equipped with a  engine and train-heating steam generator. Locomotive DE15 3 had a snowplough unit designed for clearing single-track lines, while the other five locomotives were designed for clearing double-track lines. Initially, the locomotives operated with only one snowplough unit, but locomotives DE15 1 to 3 and 6 were subsequently modified with snowplough units at both ends. DE15 3 was renumbered DE15 2053.

, no Class DE15-0 locomotives remain in service.

DE15-1000
Locomotive DE15 1002 had a snowplough unit designed for clearing single-track lines, while the other five locomotives were designed for clearing double-track lines. Initially, the locomotives operated with only one snowplough unit, but locomotives DE15 1002, 1004, and 1006 were subsequently modified with snowplough units at both ends. DE15 1002 was renumbered DE15 2052.

Type for clearing double-track lines, fitted with  engine and train-heating steam generator.

, no Class DE15-1000 locomotives remain in service.

DE15-1500
18 Class DE15-1500 locomotives were initially built, initially with a snowplough unit at only one end. Locomotives DE15 1501 to 1504, 1507, 1509 to 1512, 1514 to 1516, and 1518 were designed for clearing double-track lines, while the others were designed for single-track lines. Like the DE15-1000, these locomotives were equipped with a  engine, but had no train-heating steam generator.

From 1976, a further batch of locomotives was built by Kawasaki Heavy Industries and Nippon Sharyo with snowplough units at both ends and designed for clearing double-track lines.

, 15 Class DE15-1500 locomotives remain in service, operated by JR Hokkaido (nine locomotives), JR East (two locomotive), and JR West (four locomotive).

DE15-2050
This subclass consisted of two locomotives for clearing single-track lines. DE15 2052 was converted from DE15 1002 and was fitted with a  engine, while DE15 2053 was converted from DE15 3 and was fitted with a  engine.

, one Class DE15-2050 locomotive remains in service, DE15 2052, operated by JR West.

DE15-2500
This subclass was built between 1976 and 1979 by Kawasaki Heavy Industries and Nippon Sharyo with snowplough units at both ends and designed for clearing single-track lines. The locomotives were equipped with a  engine and no train-heating steam generator.

, eight Class DE15-2500 locomotives remain in service, operated by JR Hokkaido (five locomotives) and JR West (three locomotives).

DE15-2550
Five Class DE15-2500 locomotives were formed by modifying Class DE15-1500 locomotives with the addition of a second snowplough unit at the other end. These were designed for clearing single-track lines.

, one Class DE15-2550 locomotive remains in service, DE15 2558, operated by JR West.

Livery variations
 DE15 1534: Repainted into a light-green livery for used on JR Hokkaido Furano-Biei Norokko excursion services
 DE15 1535: Repainted into a multi color livery for used on JR Hokkaido Furano-Biei Norokko excursion services
 DE15 2508: Repainted into a white livery for use on JR Hokkaido Norokko excursion train services during summer months
 DE15 2510: Repainted into a red and black livery for use as a helper locomotive on JR Hokkaido steam-hauled SL Nemuro services since 2001
 DE15 2516: Repainted into a light green livery for use on JR Hokkaido Furano-Biei Norokko excursion services
 DE15 2558: Repainted into a blue and white livery for use on JR West excursion train services on the Kisuki Line

Conversion to DE10-3000/3500

In 2009, fourteen surplus JR East Class DE15 locomotives were sold to JR Freight for use on freight services, and these were rebuilt and renumbered as Class DE10-3000 and DE10-3500. The conversion histories and former identities of this sub-class are as follows.

Fleet status
By 1 April 1995, 71 locomotives were still in service.

, 25 locomotives remain in service, operated by JR Hokkaido (9× DE15 1500 and 5× DE15 2500), JR East (2× DE15 1500), JR West (4× DE15 1500, 1× DE15 2050, 3× DE15 2500, 1× DE15 2550).

Classification

The DE15 classification for this locomotive type is explained below.
 D: Diesel locomotive
 E: Five driving axles
 15: Locomotive with maximum speed of 85 km/h or less

References

Diesel locomotives of Japan
DE15
DE15
DE15
C-B locomotives
1067 mm gauge locomotives of Japan
Railway locomotives introduced in 1967
Kawasaki diesel locomotives
Nippon Sharyo locomotives